The Colton Line was a local streetcar line, mostly known as being a service of the Pacific Electric. It operated between Colton and San Bernardino, one of two lines in service between the two cities.

History
The line was established by the San Bernardino Valley Traction Company. The first cars operated over the line on February 22, 1902, but a derailment at Third and E in San Bernardino necessitated more work on the line. Initially planned to open for revenue service on August 26, 1902, the opening was eventually delayed to September 2. However, the Southern Pacific Railroad opposed the new line crossing their steam line in Colton and delayed opening further. The company was absorbed into the Pacific Electric in 1911. In 1913 the service was through-routed with the D Street–Highland Avenue Line. Completion of the more direct San Bernardino–Riverside Line in late 1914 greatly reduced demand on the line, with ridership reduced by more than half on the old line the following year. Despite its lesser popularity, the Colton Line outlasted the shorter route, remaining in service until February 22, 1942.

Route
The line started at the Colton station at 9th and J Streets near Colton Crossing where passengers interchanged with transcontinental trains. Cars ran west on J for a block before turning north on 8th Street. At Vernon Avenue, the tracks ran northward until the main line at 3rd Street where a right turn continued into San Bernardino.

The line connected the joint Pacific Electric and Southern Pacific stations in San Bernardino and Colton via the San Bernardino Santa Fe Depot.

References

External links

Pacific Electric routes
Light rail in California
Railway lines opened in 1902
1902 establishments in California
Railway lines closed in 1942
1942 disestablishments in California
Colton, California
Closed railway lines in the United States
Transportation in San Bernardino County, California